Iran–Sahrawi Arab Democratic Republic relations refers to the current and historical relations between the Islamic Republic of Iran and the Sahrawi Arab Democratic Republic (SADR). Iran recognized the SADR on 27 February 1980. Relations between both Iran and Morocco have been very poor because of the Western Sahara conflict. Iran has strongly supported the Polisario Front. Following the Israel–Morocco normalization agreement, relations between Iran and Morocco collapsed completely.

See Also 
Arab–Iran relations

References

 
Sahrawi Arab Democratic Republic
Bilateral relations of the Sahrawi Arab Democratic Republic